Arthur Richard Doncaster (born 13 May 1908 in Barry) was a Welsh professional footballer. He played for Bolton Wanderers, Exeter City, Crystal Palace (1932–1933; 15 appearances, 4 goals) Reading and Gillingham between 1927 and 1936.

References

External links
Doncaster at holmesdale.net

1908 births
Year of death missing
Sportspeople from Barry, Vale of Glamorgan
Welsh footballers
Association football forwards
English Football League players
Gillingham F.C. players
Bolton Wanderers F.C. players
Exeter City F.C. players
Crystal Palace F.C. players
Reading F.C. players